is a Japanese superhero and kaiju film, serving as the film adaptation of the 2015 Ultra Series television series Ultraman X. It was released on March 12, 2016, in celebration to the 50th anniversary of the Ultra Series, as well as 50th anniversary of Ultraman and 20th anniversary of Ultraman Tiga, both appearing in this movie as supporting characters. The film was scheduled for release on January 8, 2017 in the United States along with Ultraman Ginga S The Movie as a double feature. Actors of the English dub were announced on December 10, 2016 by SciFi Japan. The American release also coincided with the Canadian release from William Winckler Productions.

Synopsis

After a series of past clips of the TV series and Gourman's failed attempt at summoning original Ultraman, Xio members picked up a strange signal while celebrating Daichi's return from Australia. They traced it towards the  located in Baraji Village, Akita Prefecture and crossed path with the Tamaki mother-son pair. As a result of the greedy treasure hunter Carlos Kurosaki, Zaigorg was lifted from its ancient seal and managed to defeat Ultraman X. X was restored by Daichi, but his Devizer damaged from the fight while Gourman analyze the Tiga statue and the Sparklence brought by Yuto. In order to reseal Zaigorg, Tsukasa and Asuna attempt to coerce Carlos into returning the blue stone he stole earlier while Xio members initiate  to slow down Zaigorg from advancing, but their use of Cyber Cards were countered by his Inferno Demon Clones, Antlar and Fire Golza.

With the three monsters approaching Carlos Communication, an evacuation is finally held. At Gourman's behest, Rui brought Yuto to his mother before joining the other Xio members. As Zaigorg attacked the tower, Tsukasa was trapped under a steel beam and ordered the others to evacuate but Yuto's strong will for his mother activated the Sparklence to save her and finally becomes Ultraman Tiga, simultaneously restoring the X Devizer for Daichi to Unite with X. The blue stone in Carlos' possession summoned the original Ultraman and all three of them participated in a coordinated attack with Xio members. With Antlar and Fire Golza destroyed, X seemingly defeated their leader, but Zaigorg emerged unharmed and drain Tiga and Ultraman of their energies to summon five different Tsurugi Demaaga in various points across the globe. Gourman finished creating the Cyber Cards of Ultraman and Tiga and had Rui and Mamoru sent them to Daichi, who used it and equipped Ultraman Exceed X with the Beta Spark Armor. Using the Beta Spark Sword, he freed Tiga and Ultraman and fights against Zaigorg. The Cyber Cards of past Ultra Warriors resonated and summoned all of them to fight Tsurugi Demaaga in different portions of the world. Exceed X merged with Tiga and Ultraman, creating a huge cyber wing that charged the worldwide Ultra Warriors with the energy needed to finish off Tsurugi Demaaga. Returning to Earth, he quickly killed Zaigorg and ended his reign of terror.

The others celebrates the X's victory and the Ultra Warriors regroup for a moment before leaving. Tiga reverted to Yuto and X separated with Daichi. Because of humanity's bonds, he finally regained the true body that was lost 15 years ago and Ultraman leaves the Earth. X thanked Xio for their cooperation since the first time they met and reassured to Daichi that they will always stay united and will return should the Earth is in danger once more before leaving. Yuto awakened, nearly having no recollection of his time as Tiga but was praised by his mother, something that he had yearned for. At the headquarters, Xio members celebrates their victory but X returned to them explains that the Earth will be under attack by Desastro, a monster from Centaurus Constellation. Xio's satellite picks up the monster's sighting and the team rolls out once more.

Production
The project was first announced by Tsuburaya Productions on July 23, 2015 and in Ultraman Festival 2015. On November 28, 2015, the title and the movie poster was released in Tsuburaya Productions' blog.

Among of its supporting casts were Takami Yoshimoto, previously known for Rena Yanase in Ultraman Tiga. Takami herself is the daughter of Susumu Kurobe (the actor of the original Ultraman's protagonist, Shin Hayata), who also the guest attendant of the movie's press conference as he latter expresses his congratulations. Michael Tomioka, Carlos Kurosaki's actor was a guest actor in episode 44 of Ultraman Dyna and stated that he felt honored for being a part of the movie, having watched the Ultra Series since his childhood.

Ever since the movie's screening, several stage greetings were held. The final stage greeting was on May 11, 2016, which was held as a sign of departure for the casts of Ultraman X to the spectators, as Daichi Ozora (Kensuke) passes the baton to Ultraman Orb, the Ultra Warrior of his upcoming titular series.

English dub production
In December 2016, Japanese studio Tsuburaya Productions Company Ltd., and their U.S. distributor William Winckler Productions, Inc. announced that select U.S. theaters across all major U.S. cities will debut the English dubbed 50th Anniversary feature film of Ultraman titled Ultraman X The Movie. This was the first North American theatrical release of an Ultraman feature film in its entire 50-year history. It premiered in a double feature along with their new English dubbed film Ultraman Ginga S The Movie on January 8, 2017.

Cast

Japanese casts
Actors
: 
: 
: 
: 
: 
: 
: TAKERU
: 
: 
: 
: 
: 
: 
: 
Host of : 
Assistant of the show: 
Director: 
Videographer: 
Lighting technician: 
Sound recordist: 

Voice actors
: 
: 
Navigation Voice, Announcement: 
: 
:

English dub actors
Daichi Ozora: Britain Simons
Asuna Yamase: Elise Napier
Wataru Kazama: John Katona
Hayato Kishima: Bradford Hill
Mamoru Mikazuki: Josh Madson
Rui Takada: Valerie Rose Lohman
Takeru Yamagishi: R.J. Word
Chiaki Matsudo: Beth Ann Sweezer
Sayuri Tachibana: Alison Lees-Taylor
Shotaro Kamiki: Roy Abramsohn
Tsukasa Tamaki: Pamela Hill
Yuto Tamaki: Anisa Vong
Saeko Kirihara: Lisle Wilkerson
Carlos Kurosaki: Justin Andrews
Assistant of Show: Parissa Koo
Director: Jay Dee Witney
Ultraman X: William Winckler
Alien Fanton "Guruman": G. Larry Butler
Ultraman Ginga: Nicholas Adam Clark
Ultraman Victory: Bryan Forrest
Ultraman Zero: Daniel Van Thomas
Ultraman Max: Frank Gerrish
Narrator: David Ruprecht

Theme song

Lyrics: TAKERU, Chiaki Seshimo
Composition & Arrangement: Takao Konishi
Artist: Voyager feat. Project DMM

Notes

References

External links
Ultraman X The Movie at Tsuburaya Productions 

2016 films
2010s Japanese-language films
Ultra Series films
Shochiku films
2010s Japanese films